Martin Ďurica (born 11 July 1981 in Žilina) is a Slovak football midfielder currently playing for FK Senica, who has represented the Slovakia national team playing in the qualifiers for Euro 2004.

At club level, Ďurica played for MŠK Žilina, FC Chiasso and Artmedia Petržalka.

External links
 
 

1981 births
Living people
Sportspeople from Žilina
Slovak footballers
Association football midfielders
Slovakia international footballers
MŠK Žilina players
FC Chiasso players
FK Senica players
Slovak Super Liga players
Expatriate footballers in Switzerland
Expatriate footballers in Israel